Anna Brassey, Baroness Brassey ( Allnutt; 7 October 1839 – 14 September 1887) was an English traveller and writer. Her bestselling book A Voyage in the Sunbeam, our Home on the Ocean for Eleven Months (1878) describes a voyage around the world.

Life
Annie Brassey was born Anna Allnutt in London in 1839 to John Allnutt. As a child, she faced serious health problems. In The Last Voyage, her husband recalled that Allnutt suffered from an inherited "weakness of the chest", apparently a form of chronic bronchitis. As a young woman, she also suffered severe burns when she stood too close to a fireplace and her skirt caught fire. It took six months for her to recover from them.

In 1860, she married the English Member of Parliament Thomas Brassey (knighted in 1881 and became Earl Brassey in 1886), with whom she lived near his Hastings constituency. The couple had five children together before they travelled aboard their luxury yacht Sunbeam. The yacht was said to have been named after their daughter – Constance Alberta – who was nicknamed Sunbeam; she died of scarlet fever, aged four, on 24 January 1873. The golden figurehead of the yacht depicting her is at the National Maritime Museum, Greenwich, London.

A Voyage in the Sunbeam, describing their journey round the world in 1876–1877 with a complement of 43, including family, friends and crew, ran through many English editions and was translated into at least five languages. Her accounts of later voyages include Sunshine and Storm in the East (1880); In the Trades, the Tropics, and the Roaring Forties (1885); and The Last Voyage (1889, published posthumously). She had published privately earlier works including A Flight of the Meteor, detailing two cruises in the Mediterranean on their earlier yacht Meteor and A Voyage in the Eothen a description of their travels to Canada and the United States in 1872. She was also involved with the publication of Colonel Henry Stuart-Wortley's 1882 Tahiti, a Series of Photographs.

In July 1881, King Kalākaua of Hawaii, who had been greatly pleased with her description of his kingdom, was entertained at Normanhurst Castle, and invested Lady Brassey with the Royal Order of Kapiolani.

At home in England, she performed charitable work, largely for the St John Ambulance Association. Her collection of ethnographic and natural history material was shown in a museum at her husband's London house until it was moved to Hastings Museum in 1919. There are also several photograph albums and other ephemera held at Hastings Library. However, the vast majority of her photograph albums are now housed in the Huntington Library, San Marino, California. The collection of 70 albums, each containing 72 to 80 thick board pages, is said to contain pre-eminent examples of a historical travel album. These contain works by Brassey and others she collected, including those of commercial photographers. Brassey herself was an accomplished photographer. She joined the Photographic Society of London (later the Royal Photographic Society) in 1873 and remained a member until her death, and she exhibited some of her work in its exhibitions in 1873 and 1886.

Lady Brassey's last voyage on the Sunbeam was to India and Australia, undertaken in November 1886 to improve her health. On the way to Mauritius, she died of malaria on 14 September 1887, and was buried at sea.

Works

The Flight of the "Meteor", 1869–71 (Mann, Nephews) 1872
A Cruise in the "Eothen", 1872 (Printed for private circulation, F. Platts) 1873
A Voyage in the "Sunbeam", our home on the ocean for eleven months (Longmans, Green) 1878. In the United States: *Around the World in the Yacht 'Sunbeam', our home, etc. (Henry Holt) 1878Sunshine and Storm in the East, or Cruises to Cyprus and Constantinople (Longmans, Green) 1880In the Trades, the Tropics, & the Roaring Forties (Longmans, Green) 1885
The Last Voyage, to India and Australia, in the "Sunbeam" (Longmans, Green) 1889Tahiti, a series of photographs taken by Colonel Stuart-Wartley, with letterpress by Lady Brassey (Sampson Low, Marston, Searle, & Rivington) 1882
"St. John Ambulance Association: its Work and Objects" (supplement to the Club and Institute Journal) 23 October 1885

References

SourcesBrassey [née Allnutt], Anna [Annie], Lady Brassey (1839–1887), entry in the Oxford Dictionary of National Biography''

External links

Annie Brassey, The Online Books Page, University of Pennsylvania

1839 births
1887 deaths
Anna
British baronesses
English travel writers
Victorian women writers
Victorian writers
British women travel writers
Recipients of the Royal Order of Kapiolani
19th-century British women writers
19th-century British writers